Progress DC-1 (Originally designated Progress SO1) was a modified Progress 11F615A55, Russian production No. 301, used to deliver the Pirs module to the International Space Station. It has the pressurised cargo module removed to accommodate Pirs.

Launch
Progress DC-1 was launched by a Soyuz-U carrier rocket from Site 1/5 at the Baikonur Cosmodrome. Launch occurred at 23:34:55 UTC on 14 September 2001.

Docking
The spacecraft docked with the nadir port of the Zvezda module at 01:05 UTC on 17 September 2001. It remained docked for nine days

Undocking and Decay
On 26 September 2001 at 15:36 UTC it was jettisoned from Pirs. It was deorbited at 23:30 UTC on the same day, and burned up in the atmosphere over the Pacific Ocean, with any remaining debris landing in the ocean at around 00:01 UTC on 27 September 2001.

See also

 List of Progress flights
 Uncrewed spaceflights to the International Space Station
 Progress M-MIM2
 Progress M-UM

References

Progress (spacecraft) missions
Spacecraft launched in 2001
Spacecraft which reentered in 2001
Spacecraft launched by Soyuz-U rockets